Glenelg River may refer to:
Glenelg River (Victoria), which briefly crosses the border to South Australia.
Glenelg River (Western Australia)